The 1997 Doc Martens European League was a  professional non-ranking snooker tournament that was played from 28 December 1996 to 18 May 1997. All matches including the play-offs were played at the Diamond Centre at Irthlingborough.

Ronnie O'Sullivan won in the final 10–8 against Stephen Hendry. 


League phase

Top four qualified for the play-offs. If points were level then most frames won determined their positions. If two players had an identical record then the result in their match determined their positions. If that ended 4–4 then the player who got to four first was higher.

 28 December Match Day 1
 Ken Doherty 7–1 John Parrott
 Ronnie O'Sullivan 7–1 Steve Davis
 29 December Match Day 2
 Peter Ebdon 7–1 John Parrott
 Peter Ebdon 5–3 Ken Doherty
 Steve Davis 6–2 John Higgins
 18 January Match Day 3
 Stephen Hendry 6–2 Ronnie O'Sullivan
 John Parrott 7–1 Jimmy White
 John Higgins 6–2 Stephen Hendry
 19 January Match Day 4
 Ken Doherty 6–2 Jimmy White
 Peter Ebdon 5–3 Jimmy White
 Ronnie O'Sullivan 4–4 John Higgins
 Stephen Hendry 7–1 Steve Davis
 12 April Match Day 5
 John Higgins 4–4 Ken Doherty
 John Parrott 4–4 Stephen Hendry
 13 April Match Day 6
 Ronnie O'Sullivan 4–4 John Parrott
 Ken Doherty 6–2 Peter Ebdon
 Stephen Hendry 7–1 Jimmy White
 10 May Match Day 7
 John Higgins 4–4 Ken Doherty
 Steve Davis 5–3 Ken Doherty
 Ronnie O'Sullivan 7–1 Jimmy White
 11 May Match Day 8
 Steve Davis 4–4 John Higgins
 Ronnie O'Sullivan 4–4 Stephen Hendry
 John Parrott 4–4 Jimmy White
 Unknown Dates so far
 Steve Davis 4–4 Peter Ebdon
 Peter Ebdon 5–3 John Higgins

Play-offs 
17–18 May (Diamond Centre, Irthlingborough, England)

References

Premier League Snooker
1997 in snooker
1997 in British sport